Alexandru "Sandu" Neagu (19 July 1948 – 17 April 2010) was a Romanian footballer who played as a striker.

Club career

Alexandru Neagu, nicknamed Cappellini from Giulești by journalist Ioan Chirilă was born on 19 July 1948 in the Rahova neighborhood from Bucharest, but grew up in the  Giulești neighborhood. He started playing football for the junior squads of Giulești based club, Rapid București, this being the team for which he would play all of his career, making his Divizia A debut under coach Valentin Stănescu on 31 March 1966 in a 1–0 away loss against Petrolul Ploiești and in the next season he won the competition, Stănescu using him in only 8 games in which he scored one goal, as the first options for the offence were Ion Ionescu and Emil Dumitriu. Neagu also won two Cupa României, scoring the second goal of the 2–0 victory against Jiul Petroșani from the 1972 final. He took part in Rapid's 1971–72 UEFA Cup campaign, playing all six games, as the team reached the eight-finals, eliminating Napoli and Legia Warsaw against whom he scored a double, being eliminated by the team who would eventually win the competition, Tottenham, also taking part in the 1972–73 European Cup Winners' Cup campaign, playing all six games, helping the team reach the quarter-finals, eliminating Landskrona BoIS and Rapid Wien against whom he scored a goal, being eliminated by Leeds United who reached the final. At the end of the 1974–75 Divizia A season, the club relegated to Divizia B, but Neagu stayed with the club, scoring 17 goals in 32 matches and helping it promote back to the first division after one year. He made his last Divizia A appearance on 30 June 1977 in a 2–1 away loss against FC Constanța, having a total of 254 games played with 93 goals in the competition, also having a total of 19 matches in which he scored 5 goals in European competitions (including 4 games and two goals in the Inter-Cities Fairs Cup). Alexandru Neagu died on 17 April 2010 at age 61, after slipping and falling on the ground on the Giulești stadium while he was watching a training session of Rapid and was sent to the hospital where he died, also because he was ill of cirrhosis.

International career
Alexandru Neagu played 15 games and scored 4 goals for Romania, all under the guidance of Angelo Niculescu, making his debut on 9 February 1970 in a friendly which ended 1–1 against Peru. In his second international cap, a 1–1 against West Germany, he scored his first international goal. At the 1970 World Cup final tournament, Neagu was used by Angelo Niculescu in all the three group games as Romania did not advance to the next stage, scoring a goal and obtaining a penalty from which Florea Dumitrache scored the victory goal in the 2–1 against Czechoslovakia. He played 6 matches at the 1972 Euro qualifiers, managing to reach the quarter-finals where he scored two goals but Romania was defeated by Hungary, who advanced to the final tournament. Neagu's last game played for the national team took place on 20 September 1972 at the 1974 World Cup qualifiers in a 1–1 against Finland.

International goals
Scores and results list Romania's goal tally first, score column indicates score after each Neagu goal.

Honours
Rapid București
Divizia A: 1966–67
Divizia B: 1974–75
Cupa României: 1971–72, 1974–75

Notes

References

External links

1948 births
2010 deaths
Footballers from Bucharest
1970 FIFA World Cup players
FC Rapid București players
Romanian footballers
Romania international footballers
Olympic footballers of Romania
Liga I players
Liga II players
Association football forwards